Viatodos, Grimancelos, Minhotães e Monte de Fralães is a civil parish in the municipality of Barcelos, Portugal. It was formed in 2013 by the merger of the former parishes Viatodos, Grimancelos, Minhotães and Monte de Fralães. The population in 2011 was 3,814, in an area of 12.40 km².

References

Freguesias of Barcelos, Portugal